The Lauter (in its upper course also: Wieslauter) is a river in Germany and France.

The Lauter is a left tributary of the Rhine. It is formed by the confluence of two headstreams (Scheidbach and Wartenbach) north of Hinterweidenthal in the Palatine Forest in the German state of Rhineland-Palatinate. It flows through Dahn, crosses the border with France, flows through Wissembourg, and then forms the French-German international boundary until its confluence with the Rhine near Lauterbourg and Neuburg am Rhein.

See also 
 Lines of Wissembourg
 List of rivers of France
 List of rivers of Rhineland-Palatinate

References

Rivers of Rhineland-Palatinate
Rivers of France
South Palatinate
Rivers and lakes of the Palatinate Forest
Rivers of Grand Est
Rivers of Bas-Rhin
Rivers of Germany
France–Germany border
International rivers of Europe
Border rivers